Bagrat (in Western Armenian pronounced  Pakrad) is a male name popular in Georgia and Armenia. It is derived from the Old Persian Bagadāta, "gift of God".

The names of the Armenian Bagratuni and Georgian Bagrationi dynasties (literally, "the house of/established by Bagrat") are derived from the name.

Georgian monarchs
 Bagrat I of Iberia, Georgian prince
 Bagrat I of Mukhrani, Georgian prince
 Bagrat I of Abkhazia, Georgian king
 Bagrat I of Tao, Georgian prince
 Bagrat I of Klarjeti, Georgian prince
 Bagrat I of Imereti, Georgian king
 Bagrat II of Iberia, Georgian king
 Bagrat II of Tao, Georgian prince
 Bagrat II of Klarjeti, Georgian prince
 Bagrat III of Georgia, Georgian king
 Bagrat III of Imereti, Georgian king
 Bagrat III of Klarjeti, Georgian prince
 Bagrat IV of Imereti, Georgian king
 Bagrat IV of Georgia, Georgian king
 Bagrat V of Georgia, Georgian king
 Bagrat V of Imereti, Georgian king
 Bagrat VI of Georgia, Georgian king
 Bagrat VII of Kartli, Georgian king

Others
 Bagrat Asatryan
 Bagrat Galstanyan
 Bagrat Ioannisiani
 Bagrat Oghanian
 Bagrat Shinkuba
 Bagrat Ulubabyan
 Bagrat de Bagration y de Baviera
 Prince Bagrat of Georgia

See also
Bagrati Cathedral

References

Georgian masculine given names